North Carolina Highway 180 (NC 180) is a primary state highway in the U.S. state of North Carolina.  The highway serves as a bypass east of Shelby, serving as an alternate through route of NC 18.

Route description 

NC 180 is a two-lane rural highway that traverses  from NC 18, near the South Carolina state line, through the town of Patterson Springs, where it meets briefly with NC 226. Continuing north, it passes through Eastern Shelby, crossing US 74, then heads back to NC 18, north of Shelby.

History
Established in 1952, as a mostly new primary route around Shelby, and has not changed since. The first NC 180 was from 1932-1952, connecting the communities of Polkville to Fallston; it was renumbered as an extension of NC 182.

Junction list

References

External links 

NCRoads.com: N.C. 180

180
Transportation in Cleveland County, North Carolina